Muklassa, also known as Amooklasah Town, is the site of a former Upper Creek village in modern Montgomery County, Alabama.

See also
National Register of Historic Places listings in Montgomery County, Alabama

References

National Register of Historic Places in Montgomery County, Alabama
Native American history of Alabama
Archaeological sites on the National Register of Historic Places in Alabama
Archaeological sites in Alabama
Muscogee
Former populated places in Alabama
Geography of Montgomery County, Alabama
Muscogee tribal towns
Populated places on the National Register of Historic Places in Alabama